Bengt Uggla (9 September 1894 – 26 February 1937) was a Swedish modern pentathlete. He participated in the 1920 Summer Olympics and finished fourth. His elder brother Bertil competed in various sports, including modern pentathlon at the 1924 Olympics. According to the gravestone of Uggla family, Bengt Uggla was a son of general Gustaf Uggla and held the rank of captain.

References

External links
 

1894 births
1937 deaths
Swedish Army officers
Swedish male modern pentathletes
Olympic modern pentathletes of Sweden
Modern pentathletes at the 1920 Summer Olympics
Sportspeople from Stockholm